RTÉ News: One O'Clock is the afternoon news programme broadcast each afternoon on Irish television channel RTÉ One at 1:00pm. The bulletin airs until 1:25pm Monday to Friday and until 1:10pm on Saturday and Sunday.

It is presented by Eileen Whelan on weekdays and Ray Kennedy on weekends.

One O'Clock News is produced by RTÉ News and Current Affairs, a division of Raidio Teilifis Éireann.

History

The News at One launched on 16 October 1989 together with an extended daytime television service on RTÉ 1. The original presenter was Éamonn Lawlor, who had returned to Ireland after ten years as Europe correspondent for RTÉ News. A unified look across all RTÉ news output was immediately introduced with the News at One using the same theme music, opening titles and promos as the early evening Six One bulletin.

The One O'Clock News is usually presented by either Ray Kennedy and Eileen Whelan. Relief presenters include Mary Calpin, Sharon Tobin, Kate Egan, Vivienne Traynor, Carla O'Brien and Caitríona Perry. The programme is shorter than other RTÉ News bulletins, running for about 25 minutes. During the summer months of late July and for all of August the programme is reduced in length to just under 15 minutes in duration.

Until 2009, RTÉ broadcast a short Irish language news summary Cinnlinte Nuachta following RTÉ News: One O'Clock. This broadcast was discontinued in 2009 following Nuacht RTÉ's move from Montrose to Baile na hAbhann, County Galway. RTÉ now broadcasts a business news update as part of the RTÉ News: One O'Clock bulletin in its place.

As of 2019, the programme is the first RTÉ TV News of the day on RTÉ TV. The first morning news on TV airs on the RTÉ News channel and is a simulcast of Morning Ireland from RTÉ Radio 1.

Presenters

Current

Former presenters

External links
 RTÉ News
 RTÉ News: One O'Clock — lists recent One O'Clock programs and links to their RealPlayer streams

1980s Irish television series
1990s Irish television series
2000s Irish television series
2010s Irish television series
Irish television news shows
RTÉ News and Current Affairs
RTÉ original programming